State Aircraft Factory can refer to:

 State Aircraft Factory (Bulgaria), DSF
 State Aircraft Factory (Greece), better known through its Greek acronym KEA
 Valtion lentokonetehdas of Finland